Ken Aretsky has been described as “one of New York’s most accomplished restaurateurs of the last thirty years.”

Biography
Aretsky is a graduate of C.W. Post College.  He has been married three times.

Career Highlights
He opened his first restaurant, Truman's, in Roslyn, Long Island in 1971. It was inspired by Maxwell's Plum. He was President and General Manager of the 21 Club. Immediately after that, he bought the Christ Cella steakhouse, including the steakhouse. Christ Cellla morphed into Aretsky’s Patroon in 2019.  Along with Anne Rosenzweig, he owned Arcadia, on the Upper East Side.

References

American restaurateurs
People from New York City
American food industry business executives
LIU Post alumni
Restaurant founders